Ricky Wright may refer to:

 Ricky Wright (baseball) (born 1958), baseball pitcher
 Ricky Wright (rugby league), rugby league player
 Ricky Wright (ring announcer) (born 1986), boxing and mixed martial arts ring announcer

See also 
 Richard Wright (disambiguation)